Akella was a Russian software company specializing in the development, publishing and distribution of video games and multimedia products. The founders of Akella met in 1993 and decided to start a company together, and in 1995 formed Akella. The company comprised five in-house development teams, a publishing house, a distribution center, a localization team and a quality assurance department; in total, 250 people were employed by Akella. There were several sub-brands owned by Akella, i.e. Macho Studios that developed erotic games and published Japanese hentai dating sims.

The company is named after a Rudyard Kipling's Jungle Book character, Akela the wolf, and its logo is a wolf.

Defunct status
During 2012 the company was amid multiple lawsuits totaling ₽200,000,000 (roughly $6,000,000), that combined with the significant developmental difficulties and commercial failings of Postal III pushed Akella to the verge of bankruptcy. As a result, the company, while technically still existing, has effectively ceased operations since 2012.

Games

References

External links 

 
 

Video game development companies
Defunct video game companies of Russia
Companies based in Moscow
Video game companies established in 1993
Russian companies established in 1993
Video game companies disestablished in 2012
2012 disestablishments in Russia
Video game companies of Russia